The women's 100 metre butterfly event for the 1976 Summer Olympics was held in Montreal. The event took place on 21 & 22 July 1976.

Results

Heats
Heat 1

Heat 2

Heat 3

Heat 4

Heat 5

Heat 6

Semifinals
Heat 1

Heat 2

Final

References

External links
Official Olympic Report

Swimming at the 1976 Summer Olympics
Women's 100 metre butterfly
1976 in women's swimming
Women's events at the 1976 Summer Olympics